The 1964 Monaco Grand Prix was a Formula One motor race held at Monaco on 10 May 1964. It was race 1 of 10 in both the 1964 World Championship of Drivers and the 1964 International Cup for Formula One Manufacturers. Peter Arundell scored his first podium finish, and Mike Hailwood his first point.

Classification

Qualifying

Race

Championship standings after the race 

Drivers' Championship standings

Constructors' Championship standings

 Notes: Only the top five positions are included for both sets of standings.

References

External links 
 1964 Monaco Grand Prix at statsf1.com
 1964 Monaco Grand Prix at grandprix.com

Monaco Grand Prix
Monaco Grand Prix
Grand Prix
Monaco Grand Prix